The orange-fronted parakeet (Eupsittula canicularis), also known in aviculture as the orange-fronted conure, half-moon conure or Petz's conure is a Vulnerable species of bird in subfamily Arinae of the family Psittacidae, the African and New World parrots. It is found from western Mexico to Costa Rica.

Taxonomy and systematics

The orange-fronted parakeet was formally described in 1758 by the Swedish naturalist Carl Linnaeus in the tenth edition of his Systema Naturae. He placed it with all the other parrots in the genus Psittacus and coined the binomial name Psittacus canicularis. The type locality is northwestern Costa Rica. Linnaeus based his description on the "red and blue-headed parakeet" that had been described and illustrated in 1751 by the English naturalist George Edwards in the fourth part of his A Natural History of Common Birds. The orange-fronted parakeet is now one of five species placed in the genus Eupsittula that was introduced in 1853 by the French naturalist Charles Lucien Bonaparte. The genus name combines the Ancient Greek eu meaning "good" with the Modern Latin psittula meaning "little parrot". The specific epithet canicularis is Latin meaning "of the bright star Sirius".

The orange-fronted parakeet has three recognized subspecies:

 E. c. clarae (Moore, R.T., 1937)
 E. c. eburnirostrum (Lesson, R., 1842)
 E. c. canicularis (Linnaeus, 1758)

Description

The sexes are alike. Adults of the nominate subspecies E. c. canicularis have an orange-peach forehead (the "front") and lores, a dull blue mid-crown, and a dull green hindcrown, nape, and back. A ring of bare yellow skin surrounds the eye. Their throat and breast are pale olive brown and the rest of their underparts yellowish green. Their wings are green with bluish flight feathers. The top surface of their tail is green and the bottom surface is yellowish. Immatures are like adults but with much less orange on the forehead. Subspecies E. c. clarae has a very narrow orange forehead band, a greener throat and breast than the nominate, and a black spot on the mandible. E. c. eburnirostrum also has a narrow forehead band and is greener below than the nominate; it has a brown spot on the mandible.

Distribution and habitat

The subspecies of the orange-fronted parakeet are found thus:

 E. c. clarae, western Mexico from Sinaloa and Durango south to Michoacán
 E. c. eburnirostrum, southwestern Mexico from Michoacán to Oaxaca
 E. c. canicularis, Pacific coast from Chiapas in southern Mexico through Guatemala, Honduras, El Salvador, and Nicaragua into northwestern Costa Rica; introduced to Puerto Rico

The orange-fronted parakeet inhabits a variety of landscapes, most of them semi-open to open. These include the edges of forest, deciduous woodlands, Pacific swamp forest, savanna, and thorn scrub. It also occurs in pastures with scattered trees and plantations of palms and fruiting trees like mangoes and bananas.

Behavior

Movement

The orange-fronted parakeet forms nomadic flocks outside the breeding season and at that time reaches the higher elevations of its range; the flocks can contain several hundred individuals.

Feeding

The orange-fronted parakeet feeds on fruits (e.g. Ficus), flowers (e.g. Gliricidia), and seeds (e.g. Ceiba). The large wandering flocks "can cause serious damage to young maize and ripening bananas."

Breeding

The orange-fronted parakeet nests between January and May in Mexico and El Salvador and December to March in Costa Rica. It usually excavates a cavity in a nest of the arboreal termite Nasutitermes nigriceps but sometimes uses a natural fissure or a cavity dug by a woodpecker. The clutch size is three to five eggs; the female alone incubates them. The incubation period is about 30 days and fledging occurs about six weeks after hatch.

Both the male and female orange-fronted parakeet excavate a cavity in the termite mound using their beaks (the male doing the majority of the early digging) over the course of about a week. Following this, the birds leave the new cavity alone for 7-10 days, to allow time for the termites to seal off and abandon the damaged area. They then return and proceed to nest inside. Parakeet activity often causes the eventual disintegration of the termite nest due to irreparable structural damage, which provides an opportunity to predatory ants to enter the colony.

Vocalization

The orange-fronted parakeet's calls include "a scratchy, high-pitched keea'ah! and a lower keh'keh'keh'keh'keh". It also has "a whining ehhhhh"call.

In aviculture

The orange-fronted parakeet (more commonly known as the half-moon conure in aviculture) is sometimes kept as a companion parrot. An excitable, energetic bird that enjoys climbing and playing, it tends to be quieter than some other conure species and is good-natured when properly socialized. It is not noted as a talking bird, but may mimic a few words or sounds. In order to remain healthy, it requires regular mental stimulation and time outside of its cage in which to fly.

Status

The IUCN originally assessed the orange-fronted parakeet in 2004 as being of Least Concern but since 2020 has listed it as Vulnerable. It has a somewhat limited range and an estimated population of a half million to five million mature individuals that is believed to be decreasing. "The species is threatened by illegal trapping for the parrot trade. Population declines have been rapid in the past, but the rates of illegal capture appears to be slowing down in recent years, at least in parts of its range." It does appear to tolerate some habitat destruction.

Gallery

References

See also
 Unihemispheric slow-wave sleep

External links
 

Birds described in 1758
Taxa named by Carl Linnaeus
Birds of Central America
Birds of Costa Rica
Birds of Guatemala
Birds of Mexico
Eupsittula
Natural history of the Mexican Plateau